Pınarhisar is a village in the Kozluk District, Batman Province, Turkey. Its population is 407 (2021).

References

Villages in Kozluk District

Kurdish settlements in Batman Province